The Convent of Virgen de Las Huertas is a convent located in Lorca, Spain. It was damaged in the 2011 Lorca earthquake.

References 

Buildings and structures in the Region of Murcia
Lorca, Spain
Convents in Spain